Kantara is a 2022 Indian Kannada-language action thriller film written and directed by Rishab Shetty, and produced by Vijay Kiragandur, under Hombale Films. The film stars Shetty as a Kambala champion who is at loggerheads with an upright forest officer, Murali (played by Kishore).

Set and filmed in Keradi in coastal Karnataka, principal photography began in August 2021. The cinematography was handled by Arvind S. Kashyap, with B. Ajaneesh Loknath scoring music for the film and the action sequences were choreographed by the action director Vikram More. The production design was handled by debutant, Dharani Gange Putra.

Kantara was released on 30 September 2022. Film received generally positive reviews from critics who praised the cast performances, direction, action sequences and soundtrack. It was a huge commercial success and emerged as the second highest-grossing Kannada film of all time, after K.G.F: Chapter 2, the same year. It was also 2022's third highest-grossing film film in India.

Plot 

In 1847, there lived a king that had a great kingdom as well as a loving wife and child, but could not find peace. He sets out on a journey to discover true happiness and comes upon a stone in a forest occupied by Panjurli Daiva, a deity that protects the villagers that reside in the forest. He donates vast portion of his land to the villagers in exchange for taking the stone with him. Panjurli warns the king that his family and successors should keep their word and not reclaim the land, which will incur the wrath of Panjurli's companion, the ferocious Guliga Daiva.

In 1970, the King's successor asks a Bhoota Kola performer, who is possessed by Panjurli to make the locals hand over the land to him, which the performer refuses and states he will die vomiting blood if he tries to reclaim it. The successor raises doubt on performer's possession by Panjurli, to which the performer replies he would vanish if he is possessed, after which he runs into the forest and is indeed never seen again. As warned, the king's successor dies mysteriously, vomiting blood a few months later on the steps of the court, where he was going to argue the land case.

In 1990, Murali, a forest officer, is tasked with converting the villagers' land into a forest reserve. However, he is challenged by Shiva, a Kambala athlete from the Kaadubettu village and the missing performer's son. Shiva is backed by his patron and the village's landlord, Devendra Suttooru, who is the king's successor in the present. Although Shiva is continually asked to perform the Bhoota Kola, he refuses due to the trauma of his father's disappearance. Instead, his cousin Guruva takes his place. Murali and his staff start erecting a fence along the earmarked forest reserve. Shiva falls in love with his friend Leela and uses his connections with Devendra to appoint her as a forest guard. The villagers try to stop the fencing, but the police and forest guards (including Leela) brutally suppress them, creating a rift between Leela and Shiva even though she was following orders and could do nothing about the situation.

As the feud between Murali and Shiva intensifies, Murali decides to arrest Shiva and his friends and heads to their hideout along with Devendra's henchman Sudhakara. During the search, Murali's jeep accidently gets crushed by the trunk of a tree, which was cut by Shiva as the latter didn't expect Jeep on the way. While Murali survives with severe injury, Shiva and his companions go undercover to avoid arrest. A few days later, they return to the village to meet their families; Shiva makes up with Leela and tells her that he will surrender. However, they are caught by the police and forest guards the morning after. Guruva asks Devendra to bail Shiva, but during conversation Devendra instead tries to bribe him to act as if Panjurli orders the villagers to give him their land in the next Bhoota Kola, revealing his true intention of acquiring his ancestral land given by his predecessor to villagers. Guruva refuses and Devendra kills him; learning that Murali has figured out his ulterior motive, Devendra decides to set Shiva against him.

Having learnt about Guruva's death, Shiva meets Devendra, who lies that Murali is the Guruva's killer. Enraged, Shiva goes to kill Murali, but learns from his blacksmith friend Mahadeva that Devendra himself killed Guruva. Shiva is attacked by Devendra's henchmen, but manages to escape and meet the villagers, whom Murali has told about Devendra's land seizure. After Shiva reveals that Devendra killed Guruva, he and Murali set aside their grudge and unite the village. Devendra and his henchmen attack, leading to an intense battle where several of the villagers are killed. After nearly dying in the fight, Shiva hits his head against Panjurli's stone, gets possessed by the Guliga Daiva, and kills Devendra and his henchmen.

A few months after the battle, Shiva performs the Bhoota Kola, and is possessed by Panjurli, where he, Murali and the villagers join hands in a symbolic gesture. Later, Shiva disappears into the forest after meeting what seems to be his father's spirit. In the mid-credits scene, Shiva and Leela's son asks Sundara about his father's disappearance.

Cast 
 
 Rishab Shetty as Kaadubettu Shiva and Shiva's father  
 Sapthami Gowda as Leela
 Kishore as Muralidhar, a Deputy Range Forest Officer (D.R.F.O)
 Achyuth Kumar as Devendra Suttooru
 Pramod Shetty as Sudhakara  
 Prakash Thuminad as Raampa
 Manasi Sudhir as Kamala, Shiva's mother
 Naveen D Padil as Lawyer
 Swaraj Shetty as Guruva, Shiva's cousin
 Deepak Rai Panaaje as Sundara
 Shanil Guru as Bulla
 Pradeep Shetty as Mohana
 Rakshith Ramachandra Shetty as Devendra's Henchman
 Chandrakala Rao as Sheela, Sundara's Wife
 Sukanya as Ammakka , Devendra's Wife
 Sathish Acharya as Tabara , Leela's Father
 Pushparaj Bollar as Garnall Abbu
 Raghu Pandeshwar as Raghu, Forest Officer
 Mime Ramdas as Naaru
 Basuma Kodagu as Guruva's father
 Ranjan Saju as Lacchu
 Rajeev Shetty as Rajeev Bhandari
 Atish Shetty as Devendra's specially-abled son
 Radhakrishna Kumbale as a native resident
 Naveen Bondel as Demigod Interpreter

Cameo appearances 
 Shine Shetty as Devendra's father 
 Vinay Biddappa as the King
 Pragathi Rishab Shetty as the King's wife

Production

Development 
Director Rishab Shetty cited the conflict between nature and human beings as the theme of the film, while adding specifically that the strife between forest officers and the inhabitants in his hometown Keradi, Karnataka, in the 1990s, as the source of inspiration for the film. He further added, "It is a film from our land, from our roots, stories that are heard through generations, untapped and deeply rooted to our culture". Shetty conceived the story in 2021 during the COVID-19 lockdown. Elaborating on the title of the film, he said, "Kantara is a mysterious forest and this is a story that happens around the area... The film title has a tagline calling it a dhanta kathe or a legend. I did not want to give the film a straight or direct title. The word is not used often. While it has Sanskrit origins, it is used in Kannada too. It is used in Yakshagana too, where we call a very mysterious forest Kantara".

Filming 
The film had to present three timelines: 1847, 1970s and 1990s. Since many references through books were not available, the makers took the help of the tribes residing in Keradi where it was also filmed. Costume designer Pragathi Shetty stated that the makers "travelled the entire village and met the tribal community, who gave details about their dress". She added, "We had most of the junior artists roped in from Kundapura, and it was a challenge for me to convince them to wear tribal costumes. We also took reference to design the costume for the forest guard, played by Sapthami Gowda. We heard each year, the colour of the uniform would change, and everything, including the badges was customised". Filming took place in four forest locations in the area which included a set being built reflecting the 1990s. Art director Darani Gangeputra said, "A lot of natural sources were used to create the setups", further adding, "apart from this, we created a school, temple, and a tree house. We had 35 people from Bangalore and 15 people from the Keradi village, who helped us to study the culture". The set involved a village, including rustic homes with cowsheds, coops for hens, courtyards, areca plantations and an authentic Kambala racetrack. Shetty learned about the intricacies of Kambala and trained for four months before performing the sequence for the film in early 2022.

Music

The music of the film was composed by B. Ajaneesh Loknath. Alongside him, 30–40 musicians were brought in. Mostly involving folklore music represented using Jaanapada songs using traditional instruments, the team took was assisted by Mime Ramdas. Songs usually sung by common people during crop harvest and those popular among the tribals of the area were used as a part of the album and the background score. The song "Varaha Roopam" was supposedly plagiarised from the song  "Navarasam" as claimed by the band Thaikkudam Bridge which released Navarasam in 2017. This song gives nostalgic feeling. When the film was released on Amazon Prime, the song was modified with a new orchestral arrangement and vocals while the lyrics remained the same. The Copyright claim and the injunction was altogether dismissed by the High Court on 1 December 2022 and the original song was returned to all the platforms. Thus, within a few days of its online release, the original version of the Varaha Roopam song was restored back in Amazon Prime.

Release 
Kantara was released in theatres in Kannada on 30 September 2022 in more than 250 theatres across Karnataka, and simultaneously in the US, UK, Europe, Middle East and Australia among other places globally. After the success in Kannada, the makers announced that the film will be dubbed in Telugu, Hindi, Tamil and Malayalam languages and was released on 14 October 2022 in Hindi and 15 October 2022 in Telugu and Tamil. Though the Hindi version was announced to be released in over 800 screens across the country, later it was reported to be released in 2500 screens in the Hindi version. The film was also dubbed into Tulu language, the native language of the coastal Karnataka and was released on 2 December 2022 and was well received by the audience. It became the first Kannada movie to be released in Vietnam. Following a social media campaign based on the film's connection to Tulu culture, a Tulu language dub of the film was announced, with a release date of 25 November 2022 outside of India and 2 December in India.

Home media 
The satellite rights of the film were secured by Star Suvarna in Kannada, Star Vijay in Tamil, Star Maa in Telugu, Asianet in Malayalam and Sony Max in Hindi. The digital rights of the film were secured by Amazon Prime Video, and was digitally streamed from 24 November 2022 in Kannada, Telugu, Malayalam, Tamil languages. The Hindi version was streamed on Netflix from 9 December 2022, and was also announced by the platform that an English dubbed version of the film will be available for streaming in January 2023.

Reception

Box office 
The first day net collection was estimated to be 3.5–4.25 crore with a gross of around ₹6 crore. The first weekend gross collection was reported to be ₹22.3 crore (with net collection of around 19 crore to ₹23 crore). The estimated first week gross earning was reported to be around ₹38–50 crore. The footfalls across Karnataka was estimated to be more than 19 lakh in the first week of its release. The film reportedly collected ₹4.3 crores on its 11th day, which was the highest for a Kannada film on second Monday. The footfalls of the film was estimated to be around 40 lakhs by the time it grossed ₹60 crore. On its second Tuesday, the film was reported to have higher domestic net collections than both Ponniyin Selvan: I and Godfather. Kantara also earned more than these films in Karnataka. The film was reported to have collected over ₹70 crore in Karnataka alone by the end of the second week.

The film crossed the ₹100 crore mark within 15–17 days. The film collected ₹36.5 crore in its third weekend. The film crossed the ₹150 crore mark in 18 days. The movie grossed ₹170 crore including ₹150 crore in India and 111 crores in Karnataka. The movie grossed ₹170.05 to ₹175 crores at the end of three weeks. The worldwide gross was reported to be ₹188 crores with ₹170 in India alone and ₹32 crores in the fourth weekend. The film collected US$1 million in North America and 200K AUD in Australia, thereby becoming the first Kannada film to achieve those landmarks. With a footfall of ₹77 lakhs in less than 4 weeks, it became the most viewed film in Karnataka among all the films produced by Hombale Films. The film crossed the ₹200 crore mark in 25 days with a gross collection of ₹211.5 crore, including ₹196.95 crore from India alone. The film grossed ₹126 crores in Karnataka.

The film crossed the ₹250 crore mark in less than a month of its release. The domestic net collections of all the versions crossed ₹200 crore in 30 days. The film grossed ₹1.06 crore at the UK box office. The movie grossed ₹280 crore in 30 days. The footfalls crossed 80 lakhs in 32 days in Karnataka alone. The movie crossed the 300 crore gross collection milestone in 33 days. The film grossed ₹65 crore in its fifth week. The movie grossed ₹325 crore worldwide in 36 days. Its sixth weekend collection of ₹25.5 crores was reported to be the highest sixth weekend collection as well as the highest sixth week collection for an Indian movie beating the record of Baahubali 2: The Conclusion which had collected ₹22 crores in its sixth week. The movie was reported to have grossed around ₹350 to ₹355 crores in 41 days with a footfall of more than 1 crore in Karnataka alone. The movie collected ₹173.85 crores in 43-day run in Karnataka. The movie was reported to have grossed ₹360 crores in 44 days. The collections of the non-Hindi version was reported to be ₹280 crores at the end of six weeks. While the collections in Karnataka reached ₹180 crore, the domestic gross collections reached ₹275 crores. The movie was reported to have collected around ₹370 to ₹377 crores at the end of 50-day theatrical run. Its seventh week collection of ₹24 crores was the highest for an Indian movie surpassing ₹110 crores collected by Baahubali 2: The Conclusion in its seventh week. The worldwide gross collections crossed the 400 crore mark in 53 days. The domestic collections of the movie was reported to be the third highest of the year 2022. The movie completed 50-day theatrical run in Australia, United Kingdom, Canada, United Arab Emirates and United States. India's largest Hindi language newspaper Dainik Bhaskar reported the collections to be ₹446 crores at the end of 68 days. The movie crossed the ₹450 crores mark in 74 days. Udayavani reported the collections to have breached the ₹500 crore mark.

Telugu version 
The Telugu version grossed ₹5 crore on its first day. The Telugu version grossed ₹21.15 crore in its first week. The Telugu version grossed ₹28 crore in 10 days. The Telugu version also grossed ₹9 crore in 4 days (from 21 to 24 October) outperforming other Diwali releases. The movie collected ₹50.30 crore in 25 days run from the Telugu states. The Telugu version grossed ₹60 crore in 39 days with a net collection of ₹42 crore during the same period.

Hindi version 
The first-day net collection of the Hindi version was reported to be around ₹1.27–1.5 crore. The first-weekend collection of the Hindi version was ₹8 crore. The movie earned nett collections of ₹15 crore in the Hindi version at the end of its first week run. The net collections of the Hindi version was ₹29.1 crore in 13 days, crossing the lifetime domestic net collections of the Hindi version of Ponniyin Selvan: I. The nett collections of the Hindi version was ₹31.7 crore at the end of two weeks. The nett collections of the Hindi version at the end of 3 weeks was ₹51.50 crore. The movie collected ₹2.10 crore on its fourth Friday which was higher than the three new Hindi releases of that week. Despite the film running for three weeks, it saw its highest ever box office number (₹4.5 crore) on its fourth sunday, taking the total nett collections to ₹62.40 crore at the end of 24 days. At the end of four weeks, it collected ₹69.75 crore nett. At the end of five weeks, it collected ₹79.25 crore nett. The Hindi version grossed ₹96 crore in 39 days with a nett collections of ₹82 crore. Its gross of ₹12.7 crore in the eighth week was the highest grossing eighth week collection for a Hindi movie breaking the 21-year-old record of Gadar: Ek Prem Katha (2001) which had grossed ₹7 crore in its eighth week. It earned 80 times its first day net collections – the highest for a dubbed movie.

Critical reception 
Kantara received positive critical reviews.

Muralidhara Khajane of The Hindu wrote "Rishab Shetty succeeds in meticulously bringing a tale of myths, legends and superstition, and that too in his native dialect". He commended the acting performances of Shetty and Kishore, and further wrote, "The locations are colourful and vivid, and the background music by B. Ajaneesh Loknath represents the ethos of the land. Cinematographer Arvind S Kashyap's meditative shots showcase the native culture and capture the rustic locales in their grandeur. The filming of the Kambala sequences... is testimony to his brilliant takes". A. Sharadhaa of The New Indian Express called the film "a compelling revenge-action drama with a neat blend of crime and divinity". Sridevi S. of The Times of India called the film "a visual grandeur" and rated the film 4/5, commending the acting performances while writing that the "biggest take away is the pre-climax and climax, which is conceived and performed to perfection".

The reviewer for The News Minute stated that the film was presented by Shetty "in his self-referential tale in the garb of a masala film that is not only entertaining but also uncannily original". They wrote, "Rishab Shetty, the actor, is particularly effective in the film and that's because he is fully aware of the pitch and tone of his performance. He looks the right shape and size for a Kambala sportsman and exudes a fine balance of naivety and arrogance when it comes to the 'manly' side of his personality". However, they felt that the "writing falters a bit" in that "repetitive scenes dished out about... ideological differences" of the central characters. Priyanka Sundar of Firstpost rated the film 3.5/5 and praised the performance of Shetty while calling the music "also a star of the film that not only supports the narrative but elevates it as well". She criticized the portrayal of Leela, the love interest of the lead character as having "not really one-note" and that she was used as "an attractive lamppost".

Vivek M. V of Deccan Herald'''s rated the film 3.5/5 and felt the same in relation to Leela's character, while adding that the plotline meant Kishore's performance was "forced to remain one-note". However, he felt the music and cinematography make it "a technical marvel". He further wrote, "Having shared the screen with gifted actors, it has taken a career-best effort from Rishab to emerge the best".

Impact
The Karnataka State Government announced a monthly allowance for Bhoota kola performers over 60 years of age due to the movie.

 Prequel 
It was later speculated that Rishabh Shetty might produce Kantara 2'', a prequel to the first part. It was said that in Mangalore, Shetty had sought the permission of the god Panjurli, who gave the consent to make the film with 3 warnings. The release date is unknown.

Notes

References

External links 
 

2022 films
2020s Kannada-language films
Indian action drama films
2022 action drama films
Indian avant-garde and experimental films
Films directed by Rishab Shetty
Films set in Karnataka
Films shot in Karnataka